Karel Kutlvašr (27 January 1895  – 2 October 1961) was a Czechoslovak legionary officer and general who commanded the Prague Uprising and after February 1948 became a victim of political persecution by the communist regime of Czechoslovakia.

Biography
Karel Kutlvašr was born on 27 January 1895 in Michalovice near Havlíčkův Brod as the sixth child in the family of farmer Josef Kutlvašr. He graduated from a school Německý Brod in 1911 with a two-year business degree. He was first employed by Jenč in Humpolec. He later worked in Kiev as a clerk for Vielwart and Dědina, which exported agricultural machinery to Tsarist Russia.

In August 1914, he was among the first to enlist in the Czech companies  Kutlvašr founded units of the future Czechoslovak legions on the Battle of Galicia. As a scout, he participated in a number of important battles. He was honored many times for his heroism in battle. After the Battle of Zborov, in which he was wounded, he became battalion commander and assistant commander of the 1st MS. Rifle Regiment which was primarily commanded by Colonel Švec. With him, he also participated in the Kazan Operation on 6–7 August 1918. After the foundation of First Czechoslovak Republic, he became the interim commander of the regiment, and on 25 February 1919 he was promoted to Minister of War, replacing Milan Rastislav Štefánik. Kutlvašr was promoted to lieutenant colonel and subsequently appointed the final commander of the 1st Regiment. In Russia, he met Elizabeth Yakovlev, whom he later married.

He returned to his homeland in 1920, and here he was promoted to colonel in 1923, when he served as commander of the 1st Infantry Regiment in České Budějovice. Between 1923 and 1931 he commanded the 2nd Infantry Brigade in Chomutov. In 1928 he was promoted to brigadier general. At the age of 33, he became one of the youngest generals of the Czechoslovak Army and gradually held a number of command and pedagogical positions. From 1934 to 1939 he commanded the 4th Infantry Division in Hradec Králové and at the time of the mobilization in September 1938 he took command of Border Area 35 with the headquarters in Vamberk.

During the occupation, he was a member of the resistance organization Defense of the Nation. Under the Prague Uprising general František Slunečko ( " Alex ") was, on 5 May 1945, appointed commander of rebel troops in Prague, and, together with representatives of the Czech National Council later in the afternoon on 8 May, negotiated the conditions for implementing the surrender of German troops in Prague exchange for their free passage through the city into captivity by the armed forces of the Western Allies. This took place after February 1948 and it probably became one of the reasons for his persecution by the communist regime, carried out at the request of the USSR, which already in the summer of 1945 began to put pressure on his retirement.

He served as the military commander of Prague until 28 May 1945, when he became the interim commander of the 5th Corps in Brno, but on 1 August 1945, after complaints from Soviet envoy Zorin, he was sent on vacation, during which his fate was decided.

He returned into service, after the intervention of President Benes, and returned in February 1946 when he joined as commander of III. Corps in Pilsen, and after being promoted to the rank of divisional general later served from 1947 as deputy commander of Military Area 3 again in Brno.

Shortly after the 1948 Czechoslovak coup d'état, on 8 March 1948, he was sent on vacation and transferred to retirement on 1 June 1948. He was subsequently arrested on 18 December 1948 and, as a representative of the alleged resistance group "Truth Prevails", which was staged provocations 5th Department, in a show trial  on 16 May 1949 the State Court in Prague sentenced for high treason and sentenced to prison freedom for life and at the same time degradation to a soldier in reserve. He was imprisoned in Mírov and Leopoldov. In 1960, after the amnesty of the President of the Republic Antonín Novotný, announced on the occasion of the adoption of the Socialist Constitution, more precisely, the "completion of socialism" and the change of the name of the republic from Czechoslovakia to Czechoslovakia, he was released from serving his sentence. He returned from prison in very poor health.

After his release from prison, he lived with his wife until his death in Prague-Vršovice, Rybalkova 69. As he was awarded a retirement pension of only CZK 230 per month, he made a living first as a security guard in the Prague Castle Riding School and after having to leave, he worked as a night porter in the Nuselský Brewery. He died suddenly during a medical examination on 2 October 1961 in the Motol University Hospital in the office of doctor MUDr. Endta, whose father fought by his side in the Czechoslovak legions.

In 1968, the Municipal Court in Prague overturned all charges from 1948 and 1949. However, it was not fully rehabilitated until after November 1989. In memoriam he was promoted to General of the Army and was awarded the Milan Rastislav Stefanik Order.

On 28 October 2017 the President of the Republic, Miloš Zeman, awarded him in memoriam the Order of the White Lion of the 1st Class Military Group for extraordinary merits for the defense and security of the state.

Awards
Czechoslovak War Cross 1918
Order of the Falcon, with swords

Czechoslovak War Cross 1939–1945
Milan Rastislav Stefanik Order, II class
Order of the White Lion, I Class

Foreign Awards
: Legion of Honour
: Croix de Guerre
 Russia: Order of St. George, IV Class
 Russia: Order of Saint Anna, III Class with swords and bow
 Russia: Order of Saint Stanislaus
: Order of the Star of Romania, II Class with Swords
: Distinguished Service Order

References

Bibliography
Jindřich Černý: The Fates of Czech Theater after the Second World War - Theater and Society 1945 - 1955, Academia, Prague, 2007, pp. 19, 61, 192, 
Vratislav Preclík: TG Masaryk and his legionaries, in ČAS, magazine of the Masaryk Democratic Movement, number 97, pp. 4–8, volume XX., January–March 2012, .
Pavel Švec (ed.): General Karel Kutlvašr. Memories of the Prague Uprising. Epoch publishing house. Prague 2020. 
 Military Historical Institute Prague: In memoriam Karel Kutlvasr
 Article on valka.cz: They called his brother "Kultivátor"
 Karel Kutlvašr on the website of the Association for Military Places of Worship
 Karel Kutlvašr na bojovniciprotitotalite.cz

Notes

1895 births
1961 deaths
Czechoslovak military personnel of World War I
Czechoslovak military personnel of World War II
Recipients of the Czechoslovak War Cross
Czechoslovak generals
Officiers of the Légion d'honneur
Recipients of the Order of Saint Stanislaus (Russian)
Recipients of the Cross of St. George
Recipients of the Order of St. Anna, 3rd class
Recipients of the Milan Rastislav Stefanik Order